The McLaren MP4/14 was a Formula One car built and designed by the McLaren-Mercedes team to compete in the 1999 Formula One World Championship. Designed primarily by Neil Oatley and Henri Durand under the direction of Adrian Newey, Mario Illien provided McLaren with its bespoke engine. The car gave Mika Häkkinen his second Formula One Drivers' Championship in a row, but McLaren was unable to defend their title in the World Constructors' Championship, losing narrowly to Scuderia Ferrari.

Overview 
The MP4/14 was the fastest car of the season, with aerodynamics that were even more advanced than the previous year's all-conquering MP4/13, while the Mercedes engine remained the most powerful on the grid. However, serious reliability problems, as well as errors by the drivers, meant that the Constructors' Championship was won by Ferrari.

McLaren used 'West' logos, except at the French, British and Belgian Grands Prix.

Complete Formula One results 
(key) (results in bold indicate pole position; results in italics indicate fastest lap)

References 
 AUTOCOURSE 1999-2000, Henry, Alan (ed.), Hazleton Publishing Ltd. (1999)

External links 

McLaren Formula One cars
1999 Formula One season cars
Formula One championship-winning cars